Mao Yushi (born 14 January 1929 in Nanjing, Jiangsu) is a Chinese economist. Mao graduated from Shanghai Jiao Tong University in 1950 and was labeled a 'rightist' in 1958. In 1986, Mao was a visiting scholar at Harvard University, and in 1990, Mao was a senior lecturer at Queensland University.

Career 

He co-founded the Unirule Institute of Economics, which educated new and old generations of Chinese on the importance of private property, freedom of choice, voluntary exchange, rule of law, and other aspects of the free market economy, teaching how to transition away from central planning. On 4 May 2012, Mao Yushi was awarded the Cato Institute's Milton Friedman Prize for Advancing Liberty for his work in classical liberalism and free-market economics. In October 2014, Beijing began a "crackdown on dissent" by banning the publication of his works. In January 2017, they also shut down his website.

Criticism of Mao Zedong 

Mao Yushi wrote an online column criticizing the communist and totalitarian policies of Mao Zedong in China. He was attacked by Maoists in the country, who called for his arrest.

Family 
Mao's uncle was the famous engineer Mao Yisheng.

References

External links 
Texts by Mao Yushi translated in French and English

1929 births
People's Republic of China economists
Academic staff of the University of Queensland
Living people
Chongqing Nankai Secondary School alumni
National Chiao Tung University (Shanghai) alumni
Chinese classical liberals
Chinese anti-communists
Chinese democracy activists
Educators from Nanjing
Economists from Jiangsu
Writers from Nanjing
People's Republic of China writers